TNLA may stand for:

Ta’ang National Liberation Army
Tamil Nadu Liberation Army
Tamil National Liberation Alliance
Tuvalu National Library and Archives